Khwein al-Kabir  is a Syrian village located in Al-Tamanah Nahiyah in Maarrat al-Nu'man District, Idlib.  According to the Syria Central Bureau of Statistics (CBS), Khwein al-Kabir had a population of 2094 in the 2004 census.

References 

Populated places in Maarat al-Numan District